Pseudiragoides itsova is a species of moth of the family Limacodidae. It is found in China (Guangxi, Fujian, Hunan and Zhejiang) at altitudes between 1,200 and 2,300 meters.

The length of the forewings is 13–15 mm for males. They have a wingspan of 28–33 mm.

References

External links
 The Barcode of Life Data Systems (BOLD)

Limacodidae
Moths described in 2011
Moths of Asia